Kingsmead School may refer to:

Kingsmead School, Enfield, a secondary school in Enfield, London, England
Kingsmead School, Hednesford, a secondary school in Hednesford, Staffordshire, England
Kingsmead School, Hoylake, an independent school in Hoylake, Merseyside, England
Kingsmead School, Wiveliscombe, a secondary school in Wiveliscombe, Somerset, England

See also
Kingsmead College
Kingsmead (disambiguation)